The Prior of Inchmahome (later, Commendator of Inchmahome) was the head of the community of Augustinian canons at Inchmahome Priory, on Inchmahome in the Lake of Menteith, in Highland Stirlingshire, Scotland. The following is a list of priors and commendators:


List of priors

 Adam, fl 1296
 Maurice, 1297 x 1309
 Cristin, x 1309–1319 x
 A century of unknown priors
 Patrick de Port, x 1419
 Patrick de Cardross 1419/21–1445
 Thomas de Arbroath, 1419–1420
 Maurice de Cardross, 1445
 Gilbert de Camera, 1450–1468 x 1469
 David Noble, 1468
 Sir Thomas Dog, 1469–1477
 John Cavers, 1470–1473
 Alexander Ruch, 1474–1479
 Walter Drummond, 1477
 John Ruch, 1479

List of commendators

 David Ballon (Henryson), 1479–1517
 Peter Mason, 1480
 John Edmonston, 1481
 Patrick Mentcher, 1492
 Andrew Ballon, 1517–1529
 Robert Erskine, 1529–1537
 John Erskine, 1537–1556
 David Erskine, 1556–1605
 Henry Stewart, 1584

Notes

Bibliography
 Cowan, Ian B. & Easson, David E., Medieval Religious Houses: Scotland With an Appendix on the Houses in the Isle of Man, Second edition, (London, 1976), pp. 91–2
 Watt, D. E. R. & Shead, N. F. (eds.), The Heads of Religious Houses in Scotland from the 12th to the 16th Centuries, The Scottish Records Society, New Series, Volume 24, (Edinburgh, 2001), pp. 108–11

See also
 Inchmahome Priory

Inchmahome
Inchmahome
Inchmahome
Inchmahome